Methles is a genus of beetles in the family Dytiscidae, containing the following species:

 Methles caucasicus Riha, 1974
 Methles cribratellus (Fairmaire, 1880)
 Methles freyi Guignot, 1953
 Methles indicus Régimbart, 1899
 Methles laevis Zimmermann, 1933
 Methles punctatissimus Gschwendtner, 1943
 Methles rectus Sharp, 1882
 Methles spinosus Sharp, 1882

References

Dytiscidae